The 2017 Oxfordshire County Council election took place on 4 May 2017 as part of the 2017 local elections in the United Kingdom. All 63 councillors were elected from 61 electoral divisions which returned either one or two county councillors each by first-past-the-post voting for a four-year term of office.

Results - Summary

Aftermath

The Conservatives won the same number of seats as they did in 2013, one seat short of a majority. 

For the past four years, the Conservatives had been able to govern in a minority administration with the support of three of the four independent councillors - Lynda Atkins, Mark Gray and Les Sibley. In 2016, one of these independents, Cllr. Atkins, left the alliance.

All three of these independent councillors were re-elected in these elections, alongside Cllr Neville Harris, who was elected for the first time in 2013 but had previously declined to support the Conservatives. 

After talks with the independent councillors, two - Mark Gray and Les Sibley - agreed to continue to support the Conservatives with Cllr. Gray given the cabinet role as member for local communities. This gave the Conservative/Independent coalition a majority of 33 out of the 63 seats.

Division Results

Abingdon East

Abingdon North

Abingdon South

Banbury Calthorpe

Banbury Grimsbury & Castle

Banbury Hardwick

Banbury Ruscote

Barton, Sandhills & Risinghurst

Benson & Cholsey

Berinsfield & Garsington

Bicester North

Bicester Town

Bicester West

Bloxham & Easington

Burford & Carterton North

Carterton South & West

Chalgrove & Watlington

Charlbury & Wychwood

Chipping Norton

Churchill & Lye Valley

Cowley

Deddington

Didcot East & Hagbourne

Didcot Ladygrove

Didcot West

Eynsham

Faringdon

Goring

Grove & Wantage

Hanborough & Minster Lovell

Headington & Quarry

Hendreds & Harwell

Henley-on-Thames

Iffley Fields & St Mary's

Isis

Jericho & Osney

Kennington & Radley

Kidlington South

Kingston & Cumnor

Kirtlington & Kidlington North

Leys

Marston & Northway

North Hinksey

Otmoor

Ploughley

Rose Hill and Littlemore

Shrivenham

Sonning Common

St Clement's and Cowley Marsh

St Margaret's

Sutton Courtenay & Marcham

Thame & Chinnor

University Parks

Wallingford

Wheatley

Witney North & East

Witney South & Central

Witney West & Bampton

Wolvercote and Summertown

Woodstock

Wroxton and Hook Norton

By-elections 2017-2021

Iffley Fields and St. Mary's

Grove & Wantage

Wheatley

Wallingford

References

2017
2017 English local elections
2010s in Oxfordshire